El Centro, the Center for Puerto Rican Studies or Centro de Estudios Puertorriqueños, is a university-based research institute whose mission is to produce, facilitate, and disseminate interdisciplinary research about the experiences of Puerto Ricans in the U.S. and to collect, preserve, and provide access to archival and library resources documenting the history and culture of Puerto Ricans. To complement these core activities, Centro sponsors a year-round program of educational and cultural activities.

Location 
Since 1983, Centro has been housed at 695 Park Avenue, Rm. E1429, New York, NY 10065 at Hunter College, City University of New York (CUNY).

History 
Founded in 1973 by a coalition of faculty, students, and community leaders, Centro works closely with a network of education, research, archival, and community-based partners. Centro has been housed at Hunter College since 1983; however, it is a CUNY-wide research center. Centro staff guide and mentor Puerto Rican and other students, assist and advise community organizations and other research institutions and serve on local and national committees concerned with issues of social, economic, educational and cultural policy. In addition, CUNY faculty and staff with interests in Puerto Rican and Latino studies are invited to partner with Centro, where they utilize its extensive resources. Centro has been a founding member of the Inter-University Program for Latino Research (IUPLR) since 1989. The IUPLR, currently composed of 23 affiliate centers, is the most extensive consortium of Latino research centers in the United States.

Research 
The Centro Research Exchange program promotes institutional, faculty and student intellectual and scientific exchange within stateside academic institutions and in Puerto Rico. Since its inception the program has focused on strengthening institutional links between the City University of New York and stateside higher education and research institutions through academic and cultural exchanges and scholarly collaboration. Centro has sponsored numerous resident scholars, including theses and dissertation, postdoctoral and junior faculty fellows. The Centro Research Exchange Program has facilitated research and other academic/cultural activities for more than three hundred faculty and students.

Library and archive 

The Centro Library and Archives is devoted to collecting, preserving and providing access to resources documenting the history and culture of Puerto Ricans. Located at the Lois V. and Samuel J. Silberman Building in East Harlem, the collections include books, newspapers, periodicals, audio and video tapes, manuscripts, photographs, prints and recorded music. The Library and Archives provides services and programs to the scholarly community as well as the general public. It facilitates access to its holdings through mail and telephone services, City University's online public catalog CUNY+, participation in national databases and through the publication of finding aids. The Library and Archives promote the study of Puerto Rican history and culture through exhibitions and other public programs.

See also 

CUNY Dominican Studies Institute
Puerto Rican literature

External links 
 Centro

Hunter College
Research institutes in New York (state)
Puerto Rican culture in the United States
City University of New York research institutes